Harper's most commonly refers to Harper's Magazine, an American monthly general-interest publication.

Harper's may also refer to:

Publications
 Harper's Bazaar, an American fashion magazine
 Harpers Magazine (trade publication), a British wine and spirits industry magazine
 Harper's Weekly, an 1857–1916 American political magazine
 Harper's Encyclopedia of United States History

Other uses
 Harper & Brothers, a publishing company
 Harper's Island, a television series
 Harpers Bizarre, a musical group

See also
 Harper (disambiguation)
 Harpers (disambiguation)